Roger Federer was the defending champion, but chose not to participate in the 2007 event.

First-seeded David Ferrer beat Richard Gasquet in the final 6–1, 6–2.

Seeds
All seeds receive a bye into the second round.

Draw

Finals

Top half

Section 1

Section 2

Bottom half

Section 3

Section 4

External links
Draw
Qualifying draw

Men's Singles